Rough Cutt is the debut studio album by American heavy metal band Rough Cutt, released in 1985. It was produced by Tom Allom, who is most famous for producing Judas Priest.

The song "Take Her" was co-written by Ronnie James Dio. The songs "Dreamin' Again" and "Black Widow" were co-written by Wendy Dio, Ronnie's wife and also the band's manager at the time.
"Piece of My Heart" was originally performed by Erma Franklin, though Janis Joplin made it famous, and many people mistakenly believe Janis Joplin was the original performer of the song. "Never Gonna Die" was written by vocalist Mark Gable and guitarist Brad Carr whose band The Choirboys scored a minor hit with it in 1983. The single peaked at No. 21 on the Australian charts.

Track listing
Side one
 "Take Her" (Chris Hager, Matt Thorr, Paul Shortino, Dave Alford, Craig Goldy, Ronnie James Dio) - 3:39
 "Piece of My Heart" (Bert Berns, Jerry Ragovoy) - 4:44 (Erma Franklin cover)
 "Never Gonna Die" (Brad Carr, Mark Gable) - 4:21 (The Choirboys cover)
 "Dreamin' Again" (Alford, Hager, Thorr, Shortino, Wendy Dio) - 5:34
 "Cutt Your Heart Out" (Hager, Thorr, Shortino) - 2:28
Side two
"Black Widow" (Amir Derakh, Alford, Thorr, Shortino, W. Dio) - 4:33
 "You Keep Breaking My Heart" (Derakh, Hager, Thorr, Alford, Shortino) - 5:13
 "Kids Will Rock" (Thorr, Shortino) - 4:02
 "Dressed to Kill" (Hager, Alford, Shortino) - 4:16
 "She's Too Hott" (Hager, Alford, Shortino) - 3:27

Personnel
Production and performance credits are adapted from the album liner notes.

Band members
 Paul Shortino – lead vocals
 Amir Derakh – guitars
 Chris Hager – guitars
 Matt Thorr – bass
 Dave Alford – drums, vocals

Additional personnel
 Chorus on "Kids Will Rock" sung by The Road Runner Junior Soccer Team

Production
 Tom Allom – producer
 Mark Dodson – engineer
 Paul Wertheimer – second engineer
 Kevin Aguilar – front cover illustration
 Steve Gerdes – art direction, design
 Rough Cutt – original concept
 Wendy Dio – management for Niji Productions, Inc.

References

1985 debut albums
Rough Cutt albums
Albums produced by Tom Allom
Warner Records albums